Agnar Helgason (born 31 July 1968 in Reykjavík) is an Icelandic scientist working with genetic anthropology. PhD in Biological Anthropology, University of Oxford, 2001. He is best known for his research on the origin of Icelandic population. He is a brother of Ásgeir Helgason, the son of Helgi Valdimarsson and a brother-in-law of Tim Moore (writer).

Sources and links

 

Agnar Helgason
1968 births
Living people
Agnar Helgason